The following lists events that happened during 1818 in Chile.

Incumbents
Supreme Director of Chile: Bernardo O'Higgins

Royal Governor of Chile: Mariano Osorio (4 January-5 April)

Events

February 
 12 February - The Chilean Declaration of Independence is approved by Bernardo O' Higgins.

March 
 15 March - Battle of Quechereguas
 16 March - Second Battle of Cancha Rayada
 19 March - Battle of Talca

April 
 5 April - Battle of Maipú
 27 April - Naval Battle of Valparaiso

October
19 October -  The Spanish frigate Maria Isabel is captured by a Chilean squadron commanded by Manuel Blanco Encalada.
23 October - 1818 Chilean constitutional referendum

December 
 11 December - Thomas Cochrane, 10th Earl of Dundonald takes command of the Chilean Navy.

Births
 24 April - Juan Esteban Rodriguez Segura (d. 1901)

Deaths
 5 April - Santiago Bueras
 5 April - Manuel María de Toro, 3rd Count of la Conquista (b. 1798)
 8 April - Luis Carrera (b. 1791)
 26 May - Manuel Rodríguez Erdoíza (b. 1785)
 17 December - Fernando Márquez de la Plata (b. 1740)

References 

 
1810s in Chile
Chile
Chile